Brow may refer to:

Eyebrow, an area of thick, delicate hairs above the eye
Entryway for boarding the ship similar to a gangplank
Brow, Dumfries and Galloway, hamlet in Scotland
 A low place in the roof of a mine, giving insufficient headroom
The Brow, a band from Fremantle, Western Australia
Brow Point, the western entrance headland of Blue Whale Harbour on the north coast of South Georgia
Brow Monument and Brow Monument Trail, Coconino County, Arizona, located in the Kaibab National Forest

People with the surname
Loren G. Brow (1920–1996), nicknamed "Totch", author describing the Florida Everglades
Scott Brow (born 1969), American baseball player

See also
Broward (disambiguation)
Browder (disambiguation)
Dubrow (disambiguation)
Browell
Brower